General Rasul Pahlawan was an Uzbek military leader in Afghanistan, and the brother of Uzbek leader Abdul Malik Pahlawan.

Rasul Pahlawan was born in Faryab Province in northern parts of Afghanistan. In June 1996, he was killed in an ambush in Mazar-i-Sharif.

References 

Afghan Uzbek politicians
History of Faryab Province
1996 deaths
People murdered in Afghanistan
Mazar-i-Sharif
People from Faryab Province
1950 births